The 1998 Chevrolet Cup was a men's ATP tennis tournament held in Santiago, Chile and played on outdoor clay courts that was part of the World Series of the 1998 ATP Tour. It was the sixth edition of the tournament and was held from 9 November to 16 November 1998. Francisco Clavet won the singles title.

Finals

Singles

 Francisco Clavet defeated  Younes El Aynaoui 6–2, 6–4
 It was Clavet's 2nd title of the year and the 7th of his career.

Doubles

 Mariano Hood /  Sebastián Prieto defeated  Massimo Bertolini /  Devin Bowen 7–6, 6–7, 7–6
 It was Hood's only title of the year and the 1st of his career. It was Prieto's only title of the year and the 1st of his career.

References

External links
 ITF tournament details

Chile Open (tennis)
Movistar Open
Movistar Open